Theresa Mah is a Democratic member of the Illinois House of Representatives who has represented the 2nd district since January 2017. Mah was the first Asian American elected to the Illinois General Assembly. Mah is a co-chair of the Illinois House's Progressive Caucus.

Early life, education, and career 
Mah was born in Chinatown, San Francisco. She earned a B.A. in history from the University of California, Berkeley in 1991 and a Ph.D. in history from the University of Chicago in 1999. She has stated that her father's experience of being a "paper son" motivated her interest in studying Asian American history. Her dissertation was entitled "Buying into the Middle Class: Residential Segregation and Racial Formation in the United States, 1920–1964." She worked as an assistant professor at Bowling Green State University for six years.

She returned to Chicago in 2006 to work for the Illinois Coalition for Immigrant and Refugee Rights, and later worked for the Coalition for a Better Chinese American Community. During her time in the latter organization, she worked to ensure that the Chinese American population on Chicago's South Side was covered by one electoral district during the redistricting process. She also served as an advisor to Governor Pat Quinn.

Illinois State Representative (2017-present)

Elections 
In 2016, Mah ran as a Democrat for the Illinois House of Representatives' 2nd district seat, which was open due to incumbent Edward Acevedo's retirement. In the Democratic primary election, she defeated Alex Acevedo, the incumbent's son, with 51.25% of the vote. She ran unopposed in the general election, and won re-election in both 2018 and 2020.

Tenure 
As Illinois  State Representative, Mah has been a vocal advocate for immigrant rights, sponsoring a number of bills on the subject and appearing frequently at pro-immigrant rallies. Bills on which she has been a lead sponsor include legislation to prohibit LGBTQ discrimination in assisted or shared living facilities and to protect immigrants from discrimination by landlords.

In 2019, she was one of the co-founders of a new progressive caucus within the Illinois House of Representatives.

Committees 
As of July 2, 2022, Representative Mah is a member in the following Illinois House committees:

 Appropriations - Elementary & Secondary Education Committee (HAPE)
 Financial Impact Subcommittee (HMAC-IMPA)
 Health Car Licenses Committee (HHCL)
 Housing Committee (SHOU)
 Immigration & Human Right Committee (SIHR)
 International Trade & Commerce Committee (HITC)
 Museums, Arts, & Cultural Enhancement Committee (HMAC)
 Redistricting Committee (HRED)
 Tourism Committee (SHTO)

Other roles in politics 
After winning the 2018 general election, J.B. Pritzker appointed Mah to his Transition Committee for Equality, Equity and Opportunity.

She supported the mayoral bids of Miguel del Valle in 2011 and Jesús "Chuy" García in 2015. In 2019, Mah supported Toni Preckwinkle's campaign for mayor. In the 2023 mayoral election, Mah criticized candidate Paul Vallas, describing him as  “unfit” for office following a controversy surrounding "remarks on critical race theory". Mah endorsed García's 2023 candidacy for mayor.

Electoral history

References

External links
Representative Theresa Mah (D) at the Illinois General Assembly
 By session: 100th

Living people
Year of birth missing (living people)
Politicians from Chicago
Politicians from San Francisco
University of Chicago alumni
University of California, Berkeley alumni
Democratic Party members of the Illinois House of Representatives
Women state legislators in Illinois
American politicians of Chinese descent
Asian-American state legislators in Illinois
21st-century American politicians
21st-century American women politicians